Andrew Davidson (born April 12, 1969) is a Canadian novelist from Winnipeg, Manitoba.  Born in Pinawa, Manitoba, he graduated with a B.A. in English literature from the University of British Columbia in 1991, and worked as a teacher in Japan before returning to Canada.
He has so far published just one novel, The Gargoyle, a psychological thriller about love, religion, mental illness and medieval history, for which he received an unprecedented advance of $1.25 million.

References

External links
 

1969 births
Living people
Canadian male novelists
Writers from Manitoba 
People from Eastman Region, Manitoba
Writers from Winnipeg